Bob Burlison was an English footballer who played in the Football League for Charlton Athletic.

References

English footballers
English Football League players
Charlton Athletic F.C. players
Year of birth missing
Association football forwards